Joaquín Piquerez Moreira (born 24 August 1998) is a Uruguayan professional footballer who plays for Brazilian Série A club Palmeiras and the Uruguay national team. Primarily a left-back, he can also play as a midfielder.

Club career
On 31 July 2021, Brazilian club Palmeiras announced the signing of Piquerez on a permanent deal until 31 December 2025.

International career
Piquerez is a former Uruguayan youth international. He was part of national team squads at 2015 South American U-17 Championship and 2019 Pan American Games. In December 2019, he was called up to under-23 national team for 2020 CONMEBOL Pre-Olympic Tournament.

Piquerez received maiden call-up to senior team on 28 May 2021 for FIFA World Cup qualification matches. However, he got injured the following day and was replaced by Camilo Cándido. He made his senior team debut on 2 September 2021 in a 1–1 draw against Peru.

Career statistics

International

Honours

Club
Defensor
Uruguayan Primera División: 2017 Apertura

Palmeiras
Copa Libertadores: 2021
Campeonato Brasileiro Série A: 2022
Recopa Sudamericana: 2022
Campeonato Paulista: 2022
Supercopa do Brasil: 2023

Individual
Uruguayan Primera División Team of the Year (bench): 2020
Bola de Prata: 2022
Campeonato Brasileiro Série A Team of the Year: 2022

References

External links
 

1998 births
Living people
Footballers from Montevideo
Uruguayan people of Swiss descent
Association football defenders
Association football midfielders
Uruguayan footballers
Uruguay youth international footballers
Uruguay international footballers
Uruguayan Primera División players
Campeonato Brasileiro Série A players
Defensor Sporting players
Club Atlético River Plate (Montevideo) players
Peñarol players
Sociedade Esportiva Palmeiras players
Uruguayan expatriate footballers
Uruguayan expatriate sportspeople in Brazil
Expatriate footballers in Brazil